Flight Log: Turbulence is the second Korean studio album by the South Korean male group Got7. It was released on September 27, 2016 under the label of JYP Entertainment. It features the single "Hard Carry". The album is the second entry into the group's Flight Log series.

Track listing

Charts

Sales

Awards

Golden Disc Awards

|-
| 2017
| Flight Log: Turbulence
| Disc Bonsang
|

Music programs

References

2016 albums
Korean-language albums
Got7 albums
JYP Entertainment albums
Genie Music albums